AMG Capital Management, LLC v. FTC, 593 U.S. ___ (2021), was a U.S. Supreme Court case dealing with the ability of the Federal Trade Commission (FTC) to seek monetary relief for restitution or disgorgement from those that it found in violation of trade practices. The Court ruled unanimously that the FTC had misused its authority granted by the Federal Trade Commission Act under Section 13(b) to obtain monetary relief.

Background
Scott Tucker ran several payday loan service companies under several different names (including AMG Capital Management) over a fifteen-year period. The companies drew consumer complaints for charging excessively-high interest rates on the loans, with those using their services paying nearly triple what they had taken as a loan from undisclosed fees. The Federal Trade Commission filed a formal civil suit against Tucker's companies in 2012 that asserted that the companies were deceiving consumers, and it sought to recover money that consumers had lost to those practices. Separately, Tucker was also criminally charged under RICO and TILA statutes.

The civil case against Tucker's businesses was heard in the District Court of Nevada by Judge Gloria Navarro. The ruling also barred Tucker from engaging in any further consumer lending.

Legal counsel for Tucker appealed the decision to the Ninth Circuit. In additional to challenging the legality of the lending practices, the counsel also questioned the authority of the FTC to seek monetary damages for restitution under their charter, the Federal Trade Commission Act (FTC Act). Tucker's counsel questioned if the amendment was intended to include seeking equitable relief for restitution or disgorgement. The FTC had presumed §13(b) provided that allowance and heavily used the amended language since its introduction to seek monetary relief for consumers that were financially impacted by those the agency had found in violation of fair trade practices. The practice had been backed by prior case laws at lower courts, including FTC v. Cephalon, Inc. and FTC v. Mylan Labs., Inc.. The three-judge panel ruled unanimously to uphold the District Court's ruling, rejecting the counsel's argument about the legality of their lending practices and asserting that the FTC had the authority to seek monetary relief under the FTC Act.

Supreme Court
Tucker's counsel petitioned to the Supreme Court to hear the case against the FTC, specifically on the question of whether Section 13(b) of the FTC Act allows for the FTC to seek monetary relief. The Ninth Circuit's decision was in alignment with most other circuit courts and numerous FTC cases before, but Tucker's counsel had found that the Seventh Circuit had ruled in the 2019 case FTC v. Credit Bureau Center that Section 13(b) does not give the FTC that authority, which created a circuit split. The Supreme Court granted certiorari to the case in July 2020.

Oral arguments were heard on January 13, 2021. Court observers stated that the Justices appeared to be concerned that ruling in favor of Tucker although an appropriate textualist interpretation of the FTC Act would upend decades of precedent set by the courts.

The Supreme Court issued its decision on April 22, 2021. In a unanimous decision authored by Justice Stephen Breyer, the Court found that the FTC did not have the authority under Section 13(b) of the FTC Act to seek equitable monetary relief, overturned the lower court decisions, and remanded the case for review. Breyer wrote that the FTC could engage in other processes to seek monetary relief for consumers, or "it is, of course, free to ask Congress to grant it further remedial authority."

Reaction to decision 
The National Law Review said that the decision will curtail the FTC's powers to seek restitution in court. Acting FTC Chair Rebecca Slaughter said that the Supreme Court had "ruled in favor of scam artists" and called on Congress to strengthen the FTC's powers. Senate Commerce Committee Chair Maria Cantwell also called for new legislation in the wake of the decision.

References

External links 
 

2021 in United States case law
United States Supreme Court cases
United States Supreme Court cases of the Roberts Court